Windrose Airlines, legally Wind Rose Aviation Company, is a Ukrainian charter airline based at Boryspil International Airport. Founded on 28 October 2003, the airline's headquarters is in Kyiv; it operates charter flights to destinations in Europe, Turkey, and Egypt.

History
The airline was established in 2003 to provide charter flights to destinations in Europe and the Middle East. It is most probably part of the Privat Group of billionaire Ihor Kolomoyskyi which also owned PrivatBank before it was nationalised, Ukraine International Airlines, as well as formerly owned now-defunct airlines Cimber Sterling, Donbassaero, Dniproavia and AeroSvit.

In 2006, regular flights to Moscow and Kaliningrad in Russia were initiated. In 2008, the company expanded its route network, then sharply reduced it. Since 2008, Windrose Airlines has focused on charter flights. From 2010 to the present day, the airline has been licensed to operate regular flights, should the need arise. The airline was the first to carry out flights basing its aircraft at various airports in Ukraine.

In December 2019, the company rebranded. In June 2020, the company started domestic flights in Ukraine.

Destinations
Windrose Airlines operates scheduled and charter flights to and from the following destinations:

Austria
Salzburg – Salzburg Airport

Croatia
Dubrovnik – Dubrovnik Airport
Pula – Pula Airport
Split – Split Airport
Zagreb – Zagreb Airport

Egypt
Hurghada – Hurghada International Airport
Sharm el-Sheikh – Sharm el-Sheikh International Airport

Finland
Kittilä – Kittilä Airport
Rovaniemi – Rovaniemi Airport

Italy
Brescia – Brescia Airport

Montenegro
Tivat – Tivat Airport

North Macedonia
Skopje – Skopje International Airport

Romania
Bucharest – Henri Coandă International Airport

Serbia
Belgrade - Belgrade Nikola Tesla Airport

Slovenia
Ljubljana - Ljubljana Jože Pučnik Airport

Spain
Tenerife – Tenerife Airport

Turkey
Antalya – Antalya Airport

Ukraine
Dnipro - Dnipro International Airport
Ivano-Frankivsk – Ivano-Frankivsk International Airport
Kharkiv – Kharkiv International Airport
Kyiv – Boryspil International Airport
Lviv – Lviv International Airport
Mykolaiv - Mykolaiv Airport
Odessa - Odesa International Airport
Uzhhorod - Uzhhorod International Airport

Fleet

The Windrose Airlines fleet includes the following aircraft:

In the past, Wind Rose Aviation also used Embraer 145, Airbus A330-200, McDonell Douglas MD-82 and McDonell Douglas MD-83.

References

External links

 

Airlines of Ukraine
Airlines established in 2003
Privat Group
Ukrainian companies established in 2003